Marsiglia is an Italian village and hamlet (frazione) of the municipality of Davagna in the Province of Genoa, Liguria. As of 2009 its population was of 55.

History
As for a local legend, the village was founded by some people from the French city of Marseille, that in Italian is spoken Marsiglia. The village church, dedicated to the patron John the Baptist, was first mentioned in a church document of 1213.

Geography
Marsiglia is part of the municipal subdivision of Calvari, that includes the nearby villages of Calvari, Canate and Cavassolo.

Gallery

References

External links

Frazioni of the Province of Genoa